Denhart is an unincorporated community in Magor Township, Hancock County, Iowa, United States.

History
Denhart's population was just 10 in 1925.

References

Unincorporated communities in Hancock County, Iowa
Unincorporated communities in Iowa